Sara Lozo (born 29 April 1997) is a Serbian professional volleyball player. She plays for the Serbia women's national volleyball team as an Outside Hitter.

Awards

National team

Junior Team

 2014 Junior European Championship -  Gold Medal

Senior Team

 2022 Nations League -  Bronze Medal
2022 World Championship -  Gold Medal

Clubs
  Serbian Volleyball League : 2013/14, 2014/15, 2015/16, 2016/17, 2017/18 
  Serbian Cup : 2014/15, 2015/16
  Serbian Super Cup : 2013/14, 2014/15, 2015/16, 2016/17
  Kazakhstan League: 2019/20, 2020/21
  Kazakhstan Cup: 2020/21
  Kazakhstan Super Cup: 2018/19, 2019/20, 2020/21
  Asian Club championship : 2020/21

Individual awards

 2014 Best server, European Championships U19 2014
 2014/15 Best Outside Hitter, Serbian Superleauge
 2015/16 Best Outside Hitter, Serbian Superleauge
 2015/16 Best Outside Hitter, Serbian Cup
 2015/16 Best server, Serbian Cup
 2016/17 Best Outside Hitter, Serbian Superleauge
 2017/18 Best server, Serbian Superleauge
 2017/18 Best Outside Hitter, Serbian Superleauge
 2018/19 Best receiver, Kazakhstan league

References

External links

 Sara Lozo on volleybox.net
 

1997 births
Living people
Serbian women's volleyball players
European champions for Serbia
Serbian expatriate sportspeople in Japan
Serbian expatriate sportspeople in Russia
Serbian expatriate sportspeople in Romania
Serbian expatriate sportspeople in Kazakhstan